Kim Yeong-gi (born 24 January 1985 in Himeji, Hyōgo, Japan) is a South Korean footballer.

Career statistics
Updated to 23 February 2017.

References

External links
Profile at Nagano Parceiro

1985 births
Living people
Momoyama Gakuin University alumni
Association football people from Hyōgo Prefecture
South Korean footballers
J1 League players
J2 League players
J3 League players
Shonan Bellmare players
Oita Trinita players
Avispa Fukuoka players
AC Nagano Parceiro players
South Korean expatriate footballers
Expatriate footballers in Japan
South Korean expatriate sportspeople in Japan
Association football goalkeepers
Zainichi Korean people